Barra de Santo Antônio is a municipality in the state of Alagoas in Brazil. The population is 16,068 (2020 est.) in an area of 138.43 km². The elevation is 10 m. It is situated on the Atlantic coast, northeast of Maceió.

External links
citybrazil.com.br (in Portuguese)

References

Populated coastal places in Alagoas
Municipalities in Alagoas